Wrath of the Black Manta is a side-scrolling action game published by Taito for the Nintendo Entertainment System in North America in 1990 and in the PAL region in 1991.

Gameplay
In the game, the player goes through five levels, using throwing stars and special ninjutsu abilities called the "ninja arts", to stop a gang and the evil mastermind behind a slew of kidnappings, El Toro. Taro, a student of the Black Manta's sensei, is one of the kidnapped children.

The Black Manta has many powers, which he gets after beating a level. The player can choose which power to use by pressing start. These powers can help the Black Manta defeat enemies and bosses more quickly. The Black Manta can save kidnapped children hidden throughout each level, however, it plays no role in completing the game and does not warrant any kind of special bonus.

Part of the last level is seen through a first person perspective. Towards the end of this stage, the Black Manta has to defeat one of the bosses from the previous levels before he goes face-to-face with El Toro himself.

Version differences
When Ninja Cop Saizou was released in the U.S. and Europe as Wrath of the Black Manta, it came with several notable differences.

Graphically, many of the sprites and artwork were altered between versions. All of the cut scenes in Ninja Cop Saizou are different from those used in Black Manta. The graphics in these scenes are less in the style of anime or manga and more realistic in the U.S. and European versions. Tiny, the boss of the first stage, is also different in both versions, with the Ninja Cop version of him being more in the style of anime and manga and is a little more animated than the Black Manta versions. The Japanese version also has him shoot a projectile from his fists, where the other versions do not. The Rio de Janeiro stage on the Japanese game has a boss creature made of electricity, where in Black Manta the boss is replaced with the Voodoo warrior. The backgrounds for these boss fights are different in both versions. Finally, the sprites used for jumping upward are different in both versions. The Japanese game's sprite is drawn to show speed lines rather than the Manta's feet while jumping upwards.

There are six stages in Ninja Cop Saizou where Wrath of the Black Manta only has five. The second stage in Ninja Cop is completely removed from Black Manta. This Japanese exclusive stage also has a floating eyeball boss that isn't in Black Manta. In the final stage of the game there are also a couple alterations. In Ninja Cop, you must take on all of the bosses from the previous levels, where in Black Manta, you only have to take on one of them. The final boss is also completely different in both games. In Black Manta, the player only has to fight a character named El Toro using four of the ninja arts. In Ninja Cop, the player has to take on a space ship which drops a variety of enemies from the game.  After that, the game's final boss transforms into an alien, which the player must fight normally, unlike having to use ninja arts like in Black Manta.

In Ninja Cop Saizou, the player is presented with a credits screen after completing the game which was removed in the western version.

In addition to all of these aforementioned changes, both games have completely different soundtracks. Lastly, many of the ninja arts are learned in a different order between each game.

Development
When Ninja Cop Saizou was localized for North America and Europe, all of the game's cut scenes were replaced with more realistic drawings. One of these particular cut-scene drawings was copied from How to Draw Comics the Marvel Way by Stan Lee and John Buscema. The image in question (the face of an evil-looking man with a mustache) is featured when interrogating an enemy in the first level.

Notes

External links

A fan page for this game
A page showcasing difference between the US and Japanese versions

1989 video games
Nintendo Entertainment System games
Nintendo Entertainment System-only games
Platform games
Taito games
Video games about ninja
Video games about police officers
Video games developed in Japan